The Zimbabwe cricket team toured Ireland in June and July 2019 to play three One Day Internationals (ODIs) and three Twenty20 International (T20I) matches. All the matches were played at the Stormont Cricket Ground in Belfast and the Bready Cricket Club Ground in Magheramason. Zimbabwe last toured Ireland in 2003.

Cricket Ireland had considered cancelling the tour, following poor ticket sales for international matches earlier in the season, but the International Cricket Council (ICC) provided a US $500,000 bailout. The T20Is were scheduled to take place on the same days and venues as the corresponding women's fixtures. However, in June 2019, the women's tour was cancelled 48 hours before it was due to take place, due to a funding issue from Zimbabwe Cricket. With the cancellation of the women's matches, Cricket Ireland revised the start time of the first men's T20I fixture.

Ireland won the first two ODIs of the tour, taking an unassailable lead in the series, and their first series win at home against a Full Member side. It was Ireland's first ODI series win at home since beating Scotland in September 2014. Ireland won the third match by six wickets to win the series 3–0, their first clean-sweep in ODIs against a Full Member team. The T20I series was tied 1–1, after the first match was washed out.

Squads

Tour match

50-over match: Ireland A vs Zimbabwe

ODI series

1st ODI

2nd ODI

3rd ODI

T20I series

1st T20I

2nd T20I

3rd T20I

References

External links
 Series home at ESPN Cricinfo

2019 in Zimbabwean cricket
2019 in Irish cricket
International cricket competitions in 2019
Zimbabwean cricket tours of Ireland